Granowo  (German Granau) is a village in the administrative district of Gmina Chojnice, within Chojnice County, Pomeranian Voivodeship, in northern Poland. It is located within the historic region of Pomerania.

The village has a population of 184.

Granowo was a royal village of the Polish Crown, administratively located in the Tuchola County in the Pomeranian Voivodeship.

References

Granowo